Glimetoto Festival is an annual festival celebrated by the chiefs and people of Adaklu Traditional Area in the Volta Region of Ghana. It comprises Kpeve, Klikor, and Tsohor. It is usually celebrated in the month of November.

Celebrations 
During the festival, there is a grand durbar of chiefs where most settlements are held. They also show the bravery of their ancestors in the form of war songs, drums and dances.

Significance 
The festival is celebrated to commemorate the exodus of the people of Adaklu from Notsie in Togoland to their current place of abode.

References 

Festivals in Ghana
Volta Region